Mārtiņš Kravčenko (born July 16, 1985 in Rīga, Latvia) is a Latvian professional basketball player who plays the guard position and plays for Latvian Basketball League club BK Jēkabpils. Most of his career he spent at BK Barons which in 2008 won the Latvian Basketball League and  FIBA EuroCup championships.

References

External links
Eurocup Profile

1985 births
Living people
BK Barons players
BK Liepājas Lauvas players
Latvian men's basketball players
MBC Mykolaiv players
Basketball players from Riga
Guards (basketball)